The 43rd Infantry Division (43-ya Pekhotnaya Diviziya) was an infantry formation of the Russian Imperial Army.

Organization
1st Brigade
169th Infantry Regiment
170th Infantry Regiment
2nd Brigade
171st Infantry Regiment
172nd Infantry Regiment
43rd Artillery Brigade

Commanders
1903-1910: V.A. Orlov
1910-1915: Vladimir A. Sliusarenko
1917: Alexey Cherepennikov

References

Infantry divisions of the Russian Empire
Military units and formations disestablished in 1918